The Luzhniki Olympic Complex is one of the biggest multifunctional sports complexes of the world, built between 1955 and 1956, located in the Khamovniki district of Moscow, Russia. Formerly known as the Central Lenin Complex, it served as the Olympic Park of the 1980 Summer Olympics.

The complex can be reached by the Moscow Metro train, when leaving either Sportivnaya, Vorobyovy Gory or Luzhniki.

Venues 
Grand Sports Arena (Luzhniki Stadium)
Luzhniki Palace of Sports
Luzhniki Small Sports Arena
Olympic Pool
Druzhba Multipurpose Arena
Irina Viner-Usmanova Gymnastics Palace

References

External links
 Official website

Sports venues in Moscow
Olympic Parks